Julius Alphonsus Rykovich (April 6, 1923 – December 23, 1974) was an American football halfback, kickoff returner, and defensive back in the National Football League (NFL) for the Washington Redskins and the Chicago Bears.  Rykovich also played in the All-America Football Conference (AAFC) for the Buffalo Bills and the Chicago Rockets.  He played college football at the University of Illinois and the University of Notre Dame and was drafted in the second round of the 1947 NFL Draft.  He was co-MVP alongside Buddy Young in the 1947 Rose Bowl for Illinois, and was inducted into the Rose Bowl Hall of Fame in 1993.

References

External links

1923 births
1974 deaths
American football halfbacks
Buffalo Bills (AAFC) players
Chicago Bears players
Chicago Rockets players
Illinois Fighting Illini football players
Notre Dame Fighting Irish football players
Washington Redskins players
Players of American football from Gary, Indiana
Croatian players of American football
Yugoslav emigrants to the United States
Croatian emigrants to the United States